Sandra Lee Botham (born December 12, 1965) was the head coach of the NCAA Division I Milwaukee Panthers women's basketball team, which competes in the Horizon League. She resigned in April 2012, to take a position in the Alumni Relations area.

Career
Through her nine years as a head coach, she has compiled a 143–110 record, including a 98–61 mark in conference play. She led the Panthers to their first ever NCAA tournament appearance, and their first ever 20 win season. She attended the University of Notre Dame, where she became an All-American and earned her B. A. In 1988.

In the 2015–16 school year, Botham was athletic director at Madison West High School in Madison, Wisconsin before leaving amidst allegations of racial discrimination against two coaches. On June 1, 2017, Sheboygan South High School in Sheboygan hired Botham as girls' varsity basketball head coach.

Notre Dame statistics
Source

Head coaching record

References

External links
Profile

1965 births
Living people
Milwaukee Panthers women's basketball coaches
Notre Dame Fighting Irish women's basketball coaches
Notre Dame Fighting Irish women's basketball players
Sportspeople from Madison, Wisconsin
American women's basketball coaches
High school basketball coaches in Wisconsin
Beloit Buccaneers